Beverford is a locality situated in the Sunraysia region. The place by road, is situated about 5 kilometres north west from Tyntynder South and 8 kilometres south east from Vinifera.

Beverford Post Office opened on 23 July 1923.

Notes and references

Towns in Victoria (Australia)
Rural City of Swan Hill
Populated places on the Murray River